Tasov may refer to the following villages in the Czech Republic:
Tašov, in Ústí nad Labem District
Tasov (Hodonín District)
 Tasov (Žďár nad Sázavou District)